Fuselloviridae is a family of viruses. Sulfolobus species, specifically shibatae, solfataricus, and islandicus, serve as natural hosts. There are two genera and nine species in the family. The Fuselloviridae are ubiquitous in high-temperature (≥70 °C), acidic (pH ≤4) hot springs around the world.

Taxonomy
The family contains the following genera and species:
 Alphafusellovirus
 Sulfolobus spindle-shaped virus 1
 Sulfolobus spindle-shaped virus 2
 Sulfolobus spindle-shaped virus 4
 Sulfolobus spindle-shaped virus 5
 Sulfolobus spindle-shaped virus 7
 Sulfolobus spindle-shaped virus 8
 Sulfolobus spindle-shaped virus 9
 Betafusellovirus
 Acidianus spindle-shaped virus 1
 Sulfolobus spindle-shaped virus 6

Structure

Viruses in Fuselloviridae are enveloped, with lemon-shaped geometries. The diameter is around 60 nm, with a length of 100 nm. Genomes are circular, around 17.3 kb in length.
Biochemical characterization of SSV1, a prototypical fusellovirus, showed that virions are composed of four virus-encoded structural proteins, VP1 to VP4, as well as one DNA-binding chromatin protein of cellular origin. The virion proteins VP1, VP3, and VP4 undergo posttranslational modification by glycosylation, seemingly at multiple sites. VP1 is also proteolytically processed. SSV1 virions contain glycerol dibiphytanyl glycerol tetraether (GDGT) lipids, which appear to be acquired by the virus in a selective manner from the host cytoplasmic membrane.

Life cycle
Viral replication is cytoplasmic. Entry into the host cell is achieved by adsorption into the host cell. DNA templated transcription is the method of transcription. Sulfolobus shibatae, S. solfataricus, and S. islandicus serve as the natural host. Fuselloviruses are released from the host without causing cell lysis by a budding mechanism, similar to that employed by enveloped eukaryotic viruses.

References

External links
 Viralzone: Fuselloviridae
 ICTV

 
Archaeal viruses
Virus families